Nordic Athletics is an international governing body for the sport of athletics in the Nordic countries – Denmark, Finland, Iceland, Norway, and Sweden. It is responsible for organising Nordic competitions between the nations, as well as collating Nordic records for the best performances by athletes of the nations, and holding congresses on the sport for technical rules, coaching and sport administration. Membership of the regional body is composed of the five national athletics bodies. The group also serves to influence the International Association of Athletics Federations and European Athletics in regards to Nordic issues.

The earliest regular Nordic competition to be established was the Nordic Marathon Championships and Nordic Combined Events Championships, which were first held in 1949 as a single-host competition. The first full programme event was the Nordic Junior Athletics Championships, an outdoor track and field competition for under-21 athletes, which began in 1950. Several competitions were created and discontinued in the 1960s–1980s, including a full senior programme event in the Nordic Athletics Championships. The 1990s saw three competitions become regular fixtures: the Nordic 10000m Challenge, the Nordic Cross Country Championships, and the Nordic–Baltic Under-23 Athletics Championships. Alongside these events, the Nordic Race Walking Championships, Nordic Indoor Athletics Match, Nordic Junior Athletics Championships and the Nordic Junior Combined Events Championships comprise the ongoing competitions organised by the body.

Since 2008, the organisation has encouraged the involvement of athletes from the Baltic countries (Estonia, Latvia and Lithuania) as both guest athletes and formal competitors.

In July 2019 it began publishing Nordic Athletics Magazine.

Membership 
 Danish Athletics Federation
 Finnish Amateur Athletic Association
 Icelandic Athletic Federation
 Norwegian Athletics Association
 Swedish Athletics Association

Competitions

References

Competitions
Competition Venues. Nordic Athletics. Retrieved 2019-08-13.

Athletics organizations
Athletics in Europe
Nordic countries